The 2004–05 Israeli Hockey League season was the 14th season of Israel's hockey league. Five teams participated in the league, and HC Maccabi Amos Lod won the championship.

Regular season

External links 
 Season on hockeyarchives.info

Israeli League
Israeli League (ice hockey) seasons
Seasons